Indian Railways jointly operates passenger and freight services with its neighboring countries. Railway line construction, maintenance, border check point management is also carried out with partner railway agencies and other government agencies. Some of the railway lines & services are operational while some are non-operational or in proposal or planning stages.

India–Bangladesh 
Following table lists current, historical and future routes, passenger train services and freight services:

India–Bhutan 
Two rail routes have been planned:

India–Myanmar 
Moreh, Manipur, India – Tamu, Myanmar route is often considered as part of Trans-Asian rail connectivity. Currently India is building the Jiribam–Imphal–Moreh railway line.

India–Nepal 
Jaynagar–Bardibas railway line is a semi-operational line between India and Nepal. DEMU passenger service is operation on this route.

Following table lists current and future routes:

India–Pakistan 
Currently two rail routes exits between India and Pakistan. However the passenger train services are cancelled until further orders. Details below:

India–Sri Lanka 
Boat Mail was a passenger train service between India and Sri Lanka. However, the train currently runs till Rameswaram in India

References 

Indian Railways
International railway lines in Asia
India